Sarah-Ann Lynch is the United States ambassador to Guyana. She was nominated by President Donald Trump on September 13, 2018 and presented her credentials on March 13, 2019 to President David Granger. Ambassador Lynch was confirmed by the U.S. Senate on January 2, and was sworn in on January 11, 2019.

Early life and education
Lynch earned her B.A. from Mount Holyoke College, an M.A.L.D. degree from the Fletcher School of Law and Diplomacy at Tufts University, and an M.S. from the National War College.

Career 
Lynch served as a Peace Corps volunteer in Morocco, where she taught English at the secondary level. After joining the Foreign Service in 1993, Lynch held overseas assignments in Peru and Bangladesh. She served as director in USAID/LAC's Office of Strategy and Program Planning and the Office of South American Affairs. From 2008 to 2009 she was director of the Office of Program and Project Development for USAID Afghanistan. Lynch then became the director of USAID's Office of Iraq and Arabian Peninsula Affairs from 2011 to 2013. From 2013 to 2014 she was USAID Mission Director in Iraq. She then became senior deputy assistant administrator and acting assistant administrator of USAID's Bureau for Latin America and the Caribbean.

Personal life
Lynch speaks Arabic, French, and Spanish. Ambassador Lynch is married to her husband Kevin and has three children; Mariah, Garrett and Dylan.

See also
List of current ambassadors of the United States
List of ambassadors appointed by Donald Trump

References

Year of birth missing (living people)
Date of birth missing (living people)
Living people
Mount Holyoke College alumni
The Fletcher School at Tufts University alumni
United States Foreign Service personnel
National War College alumni
21st-century American diplomats
Trump administration personnel
Ambassadors of the United States to Guyana
American women ambassadors
21st-century American women
American women diplomats